Joseph-Olier Renaud,  (3 October 1908 – 3 March 1991) was a Canadian politician.

Born in Saint-Léonard-de-Port-Maurice, Quebec, the son of Joseph-Olier Renaud Sr., Renaud studied at the Université de Montréal and was admitted to the Quebec Bar in 1932. He was created a King's Counsel in 1946. He practised law in Montreal before becoming a Crown Prosecutor from 1937 to 1939 and a Special Prosecutor of the Sûreté du Québec in 1939. From 1938 to 1946, he was a Judge for the City of Pointe-aux-Trembles. A founding member of the Union Nationale, he was appointed to the Legislative Council of Quebec for Alma in 1946 and served until the abolition of the Council in 1968.

References

1908 births
1991 deaths
Canadian King's Counsel
Lawyers in Quebec
People from Saint-Leonard, Quebec
Union Nationale (Quebec) MLCs
20th-century Canadian lawyers